State Road 46 in the U.S. state of Indiana is an east–west state highway in the southern half of Indiana.

Route description
The western terminus of SR 46 is at I-70 east of Terre Haute at an interchange before becoming a heavily traveled modernized 2-lane highway through Spencer where it intersects SR 67 and US 231. It then proceeds to Ellettsville where it becomes a 4-lane expressway until an Interchange with I-69. It then goes directly through the college town of Bloomington. It multiplexes with SR 45 on a road known as "The Bypass" just north of Indiana University where it passes by the athletic complex. It then goes by the College Mall in Bloomington where it makes a left turn and winds towards the artist colony of Nashville passing by SR 446 and Lake Monroe. After making a right turn at SR 135 in Nashville it proceeds to Columbus where it goes under I-65 at an interchange. It then heads to Greensburg where it multiplexes with SR 3 and again becomes a 4-lane expressway.

At this point it makes a right turn and becomes a minor 2-lane highway as it closely follows I-74 until its eastern terminus at US 52 in northeastern Dearborn County.

History 
Until 1936, SR 46's western terminus was at the Illinois–Indiana state line and when U.S. Route 150 (US 150) was commissioned on that route. The eastern terminus was at the Ohio–Indiana border when US 52 was commissioned along this route. In 1974, the portion of the route west of Columbus to the Brown County Line was named Jonathan Moore Pike, after a settler in the area who served in the Revolutionary War as a member of the Commander-in-Chief's Guard.

Until recently, "The Bypass" portion in Bloomington had congestion. However, a major construction project completed in November 2012 widened the road to 4 lanes and alleviated the issue on this part of the roadway. SR 46 as a result of this project is now four lanes from Elletsville until the intersection with SR 446.

Major intersections

References 

046
Transportation in Brown County, Indiana
Transportation in Clay County, Indiana
Transportation in Dearborn County, Indiana
Transportation in Decatur County, Indiana
Transportation in Franklin County, Indiana
Transportation in Bartholomew County, Indiana
Transportation in Monroe County, Indiana
Transportation in Owen County, Indiana
Transportation in Ripley County, Indiana
Transportation in Vigo County, Indiana